Hypsopygia incarnatalis is a species of snout moth in the genus Hypsopygia. It was described by Zeller in 1847. It is found in Spain, Portugal, France, Italy, Croatia, Hungary, Romania and Greece.

References

Moths described in 1847
Pyralini
Moths of Europe